Caladenia polychroma, commonly known as the Joseph's spider orchid, is a species of orchid endemic to the south-west of Western Australia. It has a single erect, hairy leaf and one or two relatively large and colourful but smelly flowers.

Description 
Caladenia polychroma is a terrestrial, perennial, deciduous, herb with an underground tuber and which often grows in clumps. The sepals and petals have long, thin, drooping, thread-like ends. The sides of the labellum have short, blunt teeth and the tip is curled under. There are two rows of anvil-shaped, cream-coloured calli along the mid-line of the labellum. Flowering occurs from September to October.

Taxonomy and naming 
Caladenia polychroma was first described in 2001 by Stephen Hopper and Andrew Phillip Brown from a specimen collected near Kendenup and the description was published in Nuytsia. The specific epithet (polychroma) is derived from the Ancient Greek words poly meaning "many" and chroma meaning "colour" referring to the colouring of the flowers.

Distribution and habitat 
Joseph's spider orchid occurs between Frankland and the Fitzgerald River National Park in the Avon Wheatbelt, Esperance Plains, Jarrah Forest and Mallee biogeographic regions but is most common between Cranbrook and Kojonup. It grows near seasonally wet areas and drainage lines.

Conservation
Caladenia polychroma is classified as "not threatened" by the Western Australian Government Department of Parks and Wildlife.

References 

polychroma
Endemic orchids of Australia
Orchids of Western Australia
Plants described in 2001
Endemic flora of Western Australia
Taxa named by Stephen Hopper
Taxa named by Andrew Phillip Brown